Simon Peter Davis (born 8 November 1959) is a former Australian cricketer who played in one Test match and 39 One Day Internationals between 1986 and 1988.

Davis played Minor Counties cricket for Durham in 1982 and 1983, once taking 7/32 for them in the Nat West Trophy one day competition.

Davis made his debut for Victoria in 1983–84. He impressed as an economical medium-fast in-swing bowler and, after the Australian team lost several players to the South African rebel tours, was called into the Australian one-day team for the 1985–86 World Series Cup, taking 2 for 30 on debut against New Zealand.

Davis had a superb series, finishing with 18 wickets (second only to Kapil Dev with 20) at an average of 16.61, the best in the series, conceding 2.93 runs per over. He excelled in the finals against India taking 3 for 10 in the first final in Sydney when defending just 170 and 1 for 23 from 10 overs in the second final in Melbourne. This form saw him selected on tours to New Zealand and India.

Davis played his only Test at the Basin Reserve in Wellington, New Zealand in February 1986, bowling 25 overs, taking 0 for 70 and scoring a duck in his only innings.

Davis's economical reputation was damaged when during the Benson & Hedges Challenge in Perth in January 1987, England all-rounder Ian Botham hit him for 26 runs in an over. Davis regained his place in the Australian One-day team midway through the 1986–87 World Series Cup and played 15 more One-day matches for Australia, ending his career in the Bicentennial One-day match in Melbourne in February 1988.

He was regarded as a poor batsman and his First-class run tally of 98 is exceeded by his First-class wicket tally of 124.

After retiring from Victorian cricket Davis joined VJCA club Highett as captain coach. With instant results with Highett winning the Senior Division and Senior Seconds Division premiership in season 1991/92.

As of 2006, he teaches Mathematics at the Sunshine Coast Grammar School in Queensland.

See also
 One Test Wonder

External links
 

1959 births
Living people
Australia Test cricketers
Australia One Day International cricketers
Victoria cricketers
Australian cricketers
Durham cricketers
Minor Counties cricketers
Cricketers from Melbourne